Louis-Nicolas Le Prince (died Ferrières-Saint-Hilaire, 1677) was a French priest and composer. He was maître de chapelle at Lisieux Cathedral, then from 1668 priest at Ferrières-Saint-Hilaire.

Works
 Missa Macula non est in te (1663)
 Nicolas le Prince, Airs spirituels sur la parafrase du Laudate de coelis, composés à 3 vois pareilles, Ballard Paris 1671.

References

Sources 
Jean-Paul C. Montagnier, The Polyphonic Mass in France, 1600-1780: The Evidence of the Printed Choirbooks, Cambridge: Cambridge University Press, 2017.

1677 deaths
Year of birth unknown
French composers of sacred music
French male classical composers
French Baroque composers
17th-century French Roman Catholic priests
17th-century classical composers
17th-century male musicians